Nils Olaus Lennart Karl Magnell (20 January 1946 – 6 February 2020) was a Swedish pop-rock singer and guitarist. His works were first put out by Metronome Records in the 1970s.

References

External links 

1946 births
2020 deaths
People from Kalmar
20th-century Swedish male singers
Swedish pop singers
Swedish rock singers
Swedish pop guitarists
Swedish rock guitarists
20th-century guitarists